Patricio Pouchulu (born April 13, 1965) is a contemporary organic architect.

Born in Buenos Aires, he graduated as an architect at Universidad de Buenos Aires before moving to London to study with Peter Cook at The Bartlett School of Architecture, University College London, where he got a M.Arch. He was awarded by the British Council and Fondo Nacional de las Artes. He taught at the University of Buenos Aires (1989–1996), Fachhochschule-Munich, Germany (1999–2004). He is invited as external critic at the Bartlett and other schools since 2000. He is investigating on Habitat.

Architecture and influence
Pouchulu is a faraway disciple of Frank Lloyd Wright. His architecture has various exploratory lines, in the lineage of Hugo Häring, John Lautner and Paul Rudolph. His approach to Futurism, Expressionism, Japanese architecture and African art gives his projects atemporal, refreshing atmospheres, already present in his early architectural drawings and paintings. His work is devoted to the exploration of unknown architectural territories and contemporary Utopias.

In Buenos Aires he experienced the Modern Movement through the early work of Clorindo Testa; after visiting his office in the late eighties they eventually became friends. He co-organized events with Jorge Glusberg (CAYC) for the BA/Bienal Internacional de Arquitectura de Buenos Aires, where he exhibited experimental projects. Hosted by Peter Cook, in 2000 Pouchulu lectured in London on his Architectural Fictions. He attended the Venice Biennale, and Documenta in Kassel, where he met Yona Friedman.

Understanding
Pouchulu's predicate shows a subtle oscillation between historical principles and contemporary programmes, in pursuit of synthesis and symbolic unity. He is detached from conceptual fragmentation, parametric resources or digital imaginary as a source of inspiration. Furthermore, he has been an outsider of architectural movements like Deconstructivism. Though his spaces are often composed with methods from Structuralism, they show a high degree of freedom, probably inspired by Oscar Niemeyer. His work exudes spirituality, like his Grand Egyptian Museum or House in a Cliff.

Practice
Pouchulu is partnering with engineers Patrick Teuffel (Stuttgart), developing a sustainable project in the Netherlands, and since 2005 with Nick MacLean (working on conversions in protected areas in central London). Previously he worked with Susanne Biek on international competitions (Munich 1999-04). He has been applying working parameters produced from his researches, particularly ESP (Essential Spatial Project) and LEA (Light Easy Architecture), where structural and function configurations are co-determined by lightweight components and green energy.

Habitat
He is researching on Earth's Sciences, particularly Climate Change and Habitat, warning about the imminent catastrophe produced by Overpopulation, Overexploitation and Global Warming. His recent projects analyze modular design methods and passive cooling.

Projects
Below is a selection of projects:

 MNBA/Moderno, Museo Nacional de Bellas Artes (Buenos Aires) (proposed extension), Argentina, 2000–16
 Cyclotel, The Netherlands and Europe, 2012–20
 Stockholm Library, Stockholm, Sweden, 2007
 Olive House, near the Walhalla temple, Bavaria, Deutschland, 2006
 Valhall House, Hardanger, Hardangerfjord, Norway, 2003
 Kalevala, Åland, Finland, 2002
 Grand Egyptian Museum, Giza, Egypt, 2002
 Bauer House, Scotland, United Kingdom, 2001
 Meran thermal baths, Meran, Italy, 1999
 London Bridge Project, London, United Kingdom, 1998
 Project for a city in the desert, Patagonia, Argentina, 1996
 House in a Cliff, California, 1994
 Gaboto Building, 1st. version, Buenos Aires, Argentina, 1986

References

Articles
 http://chroniquesdebuenosaires.hautetfort.com/tag/patricio%20pouchulu
 http://www.politics.co.uk/comment-analysis/2012/02/13/comment-despite-falklands-argentina-and-britain-can-still-be
 https://getinfo.de/app/Dreams-and-Visions-Patricio-Pouchulu/id/BLSE%3ARN151253347
 http://www.arqchile.cl/pouchulu_arquitecto.htm
 http://archive-cl.com/page/1346807/2013-02-07/http://www.arqchile.cl/critica.htm
 https://web.archive.org/web/20071024045453/http://www.elcorreogallego.es/canalInmobiliario/index.php?idMenu=3

External links
 

Architects from Buenos Aires
Living people
1965 births
Alumni of The Bartlett